Eros and the Eschaton are an American noise pop band from Greensboro, North Carolina.

Career
Eros and the Eschaton released their debut full-length album in 2013 on Bar/None Records titled Home Address For Civil War. In 2016, the band released their second full-length album titled Weight of Matter, also on Bar/None.

Discography

Studio albums
 Home Address For Civil War (2013, Bar/None)
 Weight of Matter (2016, Bar/None)

References

Noise pop musical groups
Musical groups from North Carolina
Bar/None Records artists